Sidlaghatta Assembly constituency is one of the 224 constituencies in the Karnataka Legislative Assembly of Karnataka a south state of India. It is also part of Kolar Lok Sabha constituency.

Members of Legislative Assembly

Mysore State (Sidlaghatta Chikkaballapur constituency)
 1951 (Seat-1): G. Papanna, Indian National Congress
 1951 (Seat-2): A. Muniyappa, Indian National Congress

Mysore State (Sidlaghatta constituency)
 1957: J. Venkatappa, Independent
 1962: S. Avala Reddy, Indian National Congress
 1967: B. Venkatarayappa, Indian National Congress
 1972: J. Venkatappa, Indian National Congress

Karnataka State
 1978: S.Munishamappa, Indian National Congress (Indira)
 1983: V. Muniyappa, Indian National Congress
 1985: S.Munishamappa, Janata Party
 1989: V. Muniyappa, Indian National Congress
 1994: V. Muniyappa, Indian National Congress
 1999: V. Muniyappa, Indian National Congress
 2004: S.Munishamappa, Janata Dal (Secular)
 2008: V. Muniyappa, Indian National Congress
 2013: M.Rajanna, Janata Dal (Secular)
 2018: V Muniyappa, Indian National Congress

See also
 Chikballapur district
 List of constituencies of Karnataka Legislative Assembly

References

Assembly constituencies of Karnataka
Chikkaballapur district